Ugochi Lydia Onuoha (born 1996 or 1997), known professionally as Guchi, is a Nigerian Afropop singer.

Early life 
Guchi is the second of four children; her family is from Mbaise in Imo State. She was born in Kaduna, in Kaduna State, but grew up in the capital city, Abuja. She began singing in her church choir and for her grandparents when she was seven, and cites Michael Jackson, a favourite of her father's, as an early influence.

Career 
She sings Afropop, also dance hall and high-life, and started her professional career in 2012.

Her debut single, "No Be Jazzy", was released in April 2019. After signing with PG Records Entertainment, she released "Addicted" later that year, followed by "Closer" and in October 2020, a 5-track EP including that song, I Am Guchi. In February 2021, she released "Jennifer", which inspired a viral challenge on TikTok and was re-released in June 2021 in a re-mixed version featuring the Tanzanian singer Rayvanny. In October 2021, "Benzema", titled for French footballer Karim Benzema, debuted at Number 3 on the Billboard Top Triller Global Chart. In 2022, she was featured on Rayvanny's "Sweet" and in March released "Shattered".

In January 2020, she became a two-year ambassador for the National Drug Law Enforcement Agency.

Discography

Singles

EP

Music videos

Awards and nominations

References 

Living people
Nigerian women singer-songwriters
Nigerian women pop singers
Nigerian soul singers
People from Abuja
1990s births